Hechtia melanocarpa is a species of plant in the genus Hechtia. This species is endemic to Mexico.

References

melanocarpa
Flora of Mexico